Volleyball club Dynamo Luhansk is a former Soviet and Ukrainian men's volleyball club from Luhansk. It was founded in 1965 and until 1982 it was called Zvezda Voroshilovgrad. The club became multiple prize-winner of the USSR and Ukraine championships, and also winner of the CEV Cup Winners' Cup in 1973.

History
The club "Zvezda" was established in Voroshilovgrad in 1965.

Achievements
 CEV Cup Winners' Cup
 Winners (1): 1972–73
 Runners-up (1): 1973–74
 USSR League
 Runners-up (1): 1976, 1978–79

References

Ukrainian volleyball clubs
Soviet volleyball clubs
Sport in Luhansk
Volleyball clubs established in 1965
1965 establishments in Ukraine